Tomorrow Blue is the second album by the Swiss rock band Toad released in 1972. It was the second Toad album engineered by British producer Martin Birch. Musically, their songs take over a more blues mood on this album, although they didn't totally abandon the hard rock/prog rock sound they previously had.

On this release, the band didn't utilize an outside singer.

Track listing

 "Thoughts" (Vergeat/Fröhlich) - 6:29
 "Tomorrow Blue" (Vergeat/Fröhlich) - 9:05
 "Blind Chapmans Tale" (Vergeat) - 5:22
 "Vampires" (Vergeat/Fröhlich) - 5:42
 "No Need" (Vergeat/Fröhlich) - 3:39
 "Change in Time" (Vergeat/Fröhlich) - 12:25
 "Three O' Clock in the Morning" (Vergeat) - 0:47

CD Extra Tracks

 "Fly" (Vergeat/Fröhlich/Wenger) - 6:51
 "I Saw Her Standing There" (Lennon/McCartney) - 3:27
 "Green Ham" (Vergeat) - 3:58

Personnel

 Vic Vergeat - Guitar, Vocals
 Werner Fröhlich - Bass, Vocals
 Cosimo Lampis - Drums
 Helmut Lipsky - Violin
 Giorgio Meloni - Liner Notes 
 Silvio Caduff - Artwork 
 Produced by Chris Schwegler
 Engineered by Martin Birch

1972 albums
Toad (band) albums